The men's coxless four competition at the 1996 Summer Olympics in Atlanta, Georgia took place at Lake Lanier.

Competition format
This rowing event is a sweep rowing event, meaning that each rower has one oar and rows on only one side. Four rowers crew each boat, and no coxswain is used. The competition consists of multiple rounds. Finals were held to determine the placing of each boat; these finals were given letters with those nearer to the beginning of the alphabet meaning a better ranking. Semifinals were named based on which finals they fed, with each semifinal having two possible finals.

With 14 boats in with heats, the best boats qualify directly for the semi-finals. All other boats progress to the repechage round, which offers a second chance to qualify for the semi-finals. The boats finishing in the 2 last positions from the repechage are eliminated from the competition. The best three boats in each of the two semi-finals qualify for final A, which determines places 1–6 (including the medals). Unsuccessful boats from semi-finals A/B go forward to final B, which determines places 7–12.

Results

Heats
The first three boats of each heat advanced to the semifinals, the remainder goes to the repechage.

Heat 1

Heat 2

Heat 3

Repechage
The first three boats of the Repechage advanced to the semifinals, the remainder are eliminated.

Repechage 1

Semifinals
The first three boats of the each semifinal advanced to the Final A, the remainder to Final B.

Semifinal 1

Semifinal 2

Finals

Final B

Final A

References

Rowing at the 1996 Summer Olympics
Men's events at the 1996 Summer Olympics